Maka or MAKA may refer to:

 Maká, a Native American people in Paraguay
 Maká language, spoken by the Maká
 Maka (satrapy), a province of the Achaemenid Empire
 Maka, Biffeche, capital of the kingdom of Biffeche in pre-colonial Senegal
 Maka Albarn, a character in the Soul Eater manga and anime series
 Maka people, of Cameroon
 Makaa language, of Cameroon
 Maka Obolashvili, Georgian track and field athlete
 Maka village, in Pakistan
 MAKA, a Spanish musician

See also
 Maca (disambiguation)